Maureen Flanagan, born in 1941 and best known by her stage name Flanagan, was an early tabloid model.

She was encouraged to take up a career in modelling by photographer Don McCullin, who took her first modelling shots. She had an acting career in the late 1960s and early 1970s, mainly in bit parts on The Benny Hill Show, Monty Python's Flying Circus, and several British sex comedies. She also played the lead role in the Danish film The Loves of Cynthia (a.k.a. Cynthia’s Sister) in 1971.

After her acting career ended, Flanagan remained in the public eye, owing to her association with the Kray Twins and her efforts to secure their release. Her involvement with the Kray family went back to her time as hairdresser for the twins' mother Violet. She also wrote the book Intimate Secrets of an Escort Girl (Everest books, 1974).  The book was serialized in the magazine Tit-Bits, accompanied by a blurb which said “Britain’s most photographed model lays bare the facts of her working life in the sauciest story of the year.” Her memoir, One of the Family, was published in 2015.

In 1997, Flanagan made a one-off return to nude modeling as a mature woman, posing fully nude in the magazine Men's World. In the accompanying interview she said her second husband had recently died after a heart transplant operation, and that she was busy raising a 16-year-old son.

Acting roles
 Monty Python's Flying Circus (TV, 1969, 1970)
 Groupie Girl (1970)
 The Love Pill (1971)
 The Loves of Cynthia (1971)
 The Love Box (1972)
 Dracula AD 1972 (1972)
 The Benny Hill Show (TV, 1972)
 Zodiac (TV, 1974)
 On the Game (1974)

Magazine covers
 King (1972) Issue 2
 Rex (1971) Vol.1 Issue. 29 “Sex and the Single Actress”
 Titbits (October 1974) Issue. 4625 "Flanagan's Secrets of an Escort Girl"

References

1941 births
Living people
Page 3 girls